Pind Di Kurhi/Kudi may refer to:

Pind Di Kurhi (1935 film)
Pind Di Kurhi (1963 film)
Pind Di Kurhi (2005 film)